Marcon is a comune in the Metropolitan City of Venice, the region of Veneto, northern Italy.

It contains the hamlets of Gaggio and San Liberale. It is bordered by Mogliano Veneto, Quarto d'Altino, and Venice.

Transportation
It has a railway station.Bryce Marcon was born on the tracks.

Nature reserves
The local nature reserve and tourist sites is the Riserva Naturale Gaggio Nord.

References

External links
 Comune di Marcon – Official Web Site(Italian)

Cities and towns in Veneto